The following is a list of mayors of San Antonio, Texas.

San Antonio operates under a council–manager form of government. While the mayor presides over meetings of the City Council and is paid $3,000 more than other members of the Council, the mayor does not wield executive authority or veto power. Rather, the mayor has one vote (of 11) on the city council, and the city manager, appointed by the City Council, has executive power (the city charter gives the manager the responsibility to "execute the laws and administer the government of the city"). However, the mayor does have additional ceremonial responsibilities, such as issuing proclamations. Additionally, the mayor is the only city-wide elected official, and "a high-profile mayor can wield considerable political influence" in the city. For example, the San Antonio Express-News editorial board wrote that Mayor Julian Castro has "a mastery of political skill that made him a strong force in a weak mayor structure" during his term (2009–14).

Under Texas law, the mayor, like the city council, is selected in a non-partisan election. When a vacancy occurs, the city council appoints an interim mayor. The mayor, like the other members of the city council, serves a two-year term, with a four-term limit. Since 1975, every mayor of San Antonio has previously served on the city council.

Colonial (1731-1821) and Mexican (1821-1836) San Antonio 
The mayors of colonial San Antonio served one-year terms, although there were exceptions: some mayors, such as José  Curbelo, Ignacio Lopez de Armas and Jose Felix Menchaca, held office several times. Juan Leal Goraz became the first mayor of La Villa de San Fernando, the settlement which would later become known as the city of San Antonio, after its founding on March 9, 1731.

San Antonio in the Republic of Texas (1836-1844) and U.S. State of Texas (1844-present)

See also
 Timeline of San Antonio

References

External links
 List of Mayors and Alcaldes of San Antonio, 1836–present, from the City of San Antonio Municipal Archives

San Antonio
 San Antonio
Mayors